The Anegada skink (Spondylurus anegadae) is a species of skink found on Anegada in the British Virgin Islands.

References

Spondylurus
Reptiles described in 2012
Reptiles of the Caribbean
Endemic fauna of the Caribbean
Taxa named by Stephen Blair Hedges
Taxa named by Caitlin E. Conn
Anegada